Do You Love Me (Now That I Can Dance) is the only album issued by The Contours during their recording career at Motown Records. Issued on Motown's Gordy subsidiary in October 1962 (see 1962 in music), the album includes the hit title track and the number 21 R&B hit single "Shake Sherry". Also including the early singles "Whole Lotta' Woman" and "The Stretch", Do You Love Me is notable as the first LP to be released by Gordy Records. The song was also performed in the movies Dirty Dancing, Getting Even With Dad, Teen Wolf Too (by Ragtime), and "Beethoven's 2nd". It was performed by Bootsy Collins and the Funk Brothers in the movie Standing in the Shadows of Motown and in 2016 was used in a Pepsi-Cola commercial featuring Janelle Monáe. It also appeared in a 2020 Boston Dynamics commercial featuring dancing robots.

Barni Wright was credited for the cover design.

Track listing
All tracks composed by Berry Gordy; except where indicated

Side A
"Do You Love Me" 
"Shake Sherry" 
"You Better Get in Line"
"The Stretch" (Loucye Gordy Wakefield, William "Mickey" Stevenson)
"It Must Be Love" (Joe Billingslea, Sylvester Potts)
"Whole Lotta Woman" (Smokey Robinson, Billy Gordon, Billy Hoggs)

Side B
"Claudia" (Clarence Paul, Ivy Jo Hunter, William "Mickey" Stevenson)
"So Grateful"
"The Old Miner" (William "Mickey" Stevenson)
"Funny" (William "Mickey" Stevenson, Billy Gordon, Sylvester Potts)
"Move Mr. Man" (Berry Gordy, Jr., Rebecca Nichols)

1988 CD reissue track listing

Side A
"Do You Love Me" 6:37
"Just a Little Misunderstanding" 2:43
"Shake Sherrie" 2:51
"Can You Do It?" 2:19
"Don't Let Her Be Your Baby" 2:50

Side B
"First I Look at the Purse" 3:00
"Whole Lotta Woman" 2:37
"Can You Jerk Like Me?" 2:30
"It's So Hard Being a Loser" 2:39
"You Get Ugly" 2:22

Note: The Song "Do You Love Me (Now That I Can Dance)" on the CD/tape (Not LP) reissue versions is not the 1962 hit single version (2:54). It is some kind of very strange extended disco remix (6:37) version. Also, besides the songs "Shake Sherrie" and "Whole Lotta Woman" the other songs are different from the original 1962 LP release and consist of later hits, etc.

References

1962 debut albums
Gordy Records albums
Albums produced by Berry Gordy
The Contours albums